In Greek mythology, Phyllodoce was one of the 50 Nereids, sea-nymph daughters of the 'Old Man of the Sea' Nereus and the Oceanid Doris. She was one of the nymphs in the train of Cyrene. Phyllodoce was described to have bright, waving locks of hair and a slender pale neck.

Notes

References 

 Gaius Julius Hyginus, Fabulae from The Myths of Hyginus translated and edited by Mary Grant. University of Kansas Publications in Humanistic Studies. Online version at the Topos Text Project.
 Publius Vergilius Maro, Bucolics, Aeneid, and Georgics of Vergil. J. B. Greenough. Boston. Ginn & Co. 1900. Online version at the Perseus Digital Library.

Nereids